The 2006 Russian Super Cup was the 4th Russian Super Cup match, a football match which was to be contested between the 2005 Russian Premier League champion and the winner of 2004–05 Russian Cup. However, because the same team won both the league and the cup for the second consecutive season, the match was contested between the champion and the runner-up of the Russian Premier League, CSKA Moscow and Spartak Moscow, respectively. The match was held on 11 March 2006 at the Luzhniki Stadium in Moscow, Russia. CSKA Moscow beat Spartak Moscow 3–2 to win their second Russian Super Cup.

Match details

See also
2006 in Russian football
2005 Russian Premier League
2004–05 Russian Cup

External links
 Official stats

Super Cup
Russian Super Cup
Russian Super Cup 2006
Russian Super Cup 2006
March 2006 sports events in Europe
2006 in Moscow
Sports competitions in Moscow